Leocereus bahiensis is a species of cactus and the only species of the genus Leocereus.

Distribution
The cactus is endemic to Brazil,  within Bahia state. It is found growing in the campos rupestres (rocky fields) montane savanna ecoregion of the Atlantic Forest biome.

It grows in rocky shady places such as amongst shrubs, or near cliffs and rocks.

Description
Leocereus bahiensis has stems that are long, thing and almost terete. A full adult plant can grow up to 2 meters in length and about 1.5 cm in diameter.

They tend to grow like vines, they do not have wool or hairs but the do have needle like spines (about 4 cm long, yellowish brown in color) and felt. In Bahia it is called the "tail of the fox" due to its long thing bristle like composition.

The flower is white and narrow and within it are hair bristle spines.

The areoles are close together and circular. The Leocereus bahiensis has fruit 10 to 12 mm with seeds about 1.5 mm long.

Conservation
Leocereus bahiensis are being affected by habitat loss, though it has a wide range. The eastern range of the plant is generally regarded as ending up in an area that is not ideal for agricultural growth. The major threat to habitat loss that happens within numerous national parks (Parque Nacional da Chapada Diamantina, Parque Estadual de Morro Chapeu, Parque Nacional Boqueirão da Onça and Parque Nacional do Rio Parnaiba) is due to industrialization. The western area of its range is most affected by industrial-scale agriculture of soy, Eucalyptus and cotton.

Uses
This plant is one of the few cacti that contain caffeine and mescaline. Mescaline is a psychedelic drug that is produced by some cacti and also called peyote. Leocereus bahiensis was not confirmed part of the genus Leocereus until 2012

References

Trichocereeae
Cacti of South America
Endemic flora of Brazil
Flora of Bahia
Flora of the Atlantic Forest
Cactoideae genera
Monotypic Cactaceae genera